is a Japanese retired sprinter. She competed in the 4 × 100 metres relay at the 1997 World Championships, the 100 metres and 4 × 100 metres relay at the 1999 World Championships and the 4 × 100 metres relay at the 2003 World Championships. She was a seven-time national champion in the 100 metres and a six-time national champion in the 200 metres at the Japanese Championships. She is the former Japanese record holder in the 100 metres and 200 metres, and the current Japanese record holder in the indoor 200 metres.

She married Japanese sprinter Shigeyuki Kojima in February 2004. She changed her name to Motoka Kojima, but she reverted to her original name.

Personal bests

International competition

National titles
Japanese Championships
100 m: 1998, 1999, 2000, 2001, 2002, 2003, 2004
200 m: 1998, 1999, 2000, 2001, 2002, 2003

References

External links

Motoka Arai at JAAF  (archived)

1974 births
Living people
Japanese female sprinters
Sportspeople from Kobe
World Athletics Championships athletes for Japan
Athletes (track and field) at the 1998 Asian Games
Athletes (track and field) at the 2002 Asian Games
Japan Championships in Athletics winners
Asian Games competitors for Japan
20th-century Japanese women